is a railway station in the town of Higashiizu, Shizuoka Prefecture, Japan, operated by the privately owned Izu Kyūkō Line .

Lines

Station layout
Katase-Shirata Station has two elevated opposing side platforms serving two tracks on an embankment. The platforms are connected by a level crossing, and the station building is at a lower level to one side. The station is staffed.

Platforms

Adjacent stations

History 
Katase-Shirata Station was opened on December 10, 1961.

Passenger statistics
In fiscal 2017, the station was used by an average of 198 passengers daily (boarding passengers only).

Surrounding area
Katase Onsen
Shirata Onsen
Atagawa Onsen Hospital

See also
 List of Railway Stations in Japan

References

External links

Official home page

Railway stations in Shizuoka Prefecture
Izu Kyūkō Line
Railway stations in Japan opened in 1961
Stations of Izu Kyūkō
Higashiizu, Shizuoka